Euxoa albipennis is a moth of the family Noctuidae first described by Augustus Radcliffe Grote in 1876. It is found from coast to coast in southern Canada and the northern parts of the United States, ranging southward in the west to New Mexico, Arizona and California.

The wingspan is 30–35 mm.

Larvae have been reported from Oxytropis, Lupinus, Melilotus, Helianthus, Solanum tuberosum and Zea mays.

External links

Euxoa
Moths of North America
Moths described in 1876